Josh Hart (born March 6, 1995) is an American professional basketball player for the New York Knicks of the National Basketball Association (NBA). He was selected in the first round of the 2017 NBA draft by the Utah Jazz with the 30th overall pick before being traded on draft night to the Los Angeles Lakers.

Hart played college basketball for Villanova. As a sophomore, Hart was named the Big East tournament most outstanding player. He was named a third-team All-American as a junior, when he helped lead the Wildcats to a national championship in 2016. As a senior in 2017, he was a consensus first-team All-American. He played two seasons for the Lakers before being traded to the New Orleans Pelicans in 2019 in a package for Anthony Davis.

Early life
Hart was born on March 6, 1995, in Silver Spring, Maryland, to Moses and Pat Hart. He has two siblings, Moses Joseph Hart and Aimee Hart. He is also the great-nephew of the baseball catcher Elston Howard. Growing up, Hart gravitated toward basketball and earned a reputation as a high-energy player. While he excelled in basketball from a young age, Hart didn't get any interest from private schools and enrolled at Wheaton High School. He briefly attended Wheaton before transferring to Sidwell Friends School, where as a junior he averaged 20.6 points and 11.6 rebounds per game. However, he was nearly kicked out of school due to poor grades until several students and parents petitioned the school to give him a second chance. As a senior, Hart averaged 24.3 points, 13.4 rebounds and 2.8 steals per game in leading the team to a 22–9 record. He was a first-team All-Met selection by The Washington Post and Rivals.com's 82nd-ranked prospect in the class of 2013. After considering Rutgers and Penn State, Hart signed a letter of intent with Villanova in November 2012. "It's about doing the things that the coaches want me to do," he said after committing. "I might not hit the winning three but I'm going to be the one that goes and gets a rebound when we need it and goes on the floor for a loose ball, anything to win." He got to know future Villanova teammate Kris Jenkins while playing AAU basketball in the Washington area.

Hart was awarded Boy Scouts of America's highest rank, Eagle Scout, and became one of only three known Eagle Scouts who have played in the NCAA's Final Four (along with Princeton's Bill Bradley and Stanford's Mark Madsen). He is the only Eagle Scout to ever start on an NCAA Men's Basketball Championship team.

College career

Freshman
A 2013–14 Big East All-Rookie Team selection, Hart averaged 7.8 points and 4.0 rebounds per contest as a freshman at Villanova. He was named Big East Rookie of the Week three times. He did not shoot the ball particularly well, making 31 percent of his three-point tries, but possessed "amazing confidence," according to assistant coach Baker Dunleavy. In the second game of his collegiate career, a 90–59 win over Mount St. Mary's, Hart posted a double-double of 17 points and 11 rebounds. He scored a season-high 19 points in an 88–67 win over Rider on December 21, 2013. Hart had 18 points and eight rebounds in a loss to Seton Hall in the Big East tournament quarterfinals.

Sophomore
Hart and teammate Darrun Hilliard both scored 20 points in an 85–62 rout of Temple on December 14, 2014. Hart scored 21 points in a December 20 game against Syracuse. The Wildcats never led in regulation and were down by 14 points in the second half, but managed to pull out an 82–77 overtime win. On February 28, 2015, in the second half of a game against Xavier, Hart was hit in the mouth during a scramble for the ball, requiring stitches on his lip.

As a sophomore, Hart was named the Big East's sixth man of the year at the conclusion of the regular season. "He's the perfect sixth man because he can come in and play any position except probably point guard," head coach Jay Wright said. Hart was the most outstanding player of the 2015 Big East men's basketball tournament, the first bench player to receive the honor. He was the tournament's leading scorer at 17.7 points per game, including a 20-point performance in an 84–49 quarterfinals victory over Marquette. He improved his three-point shooting to 47.3 percent, forcing opposing teams to guard him more on the perimeter. He improved his season averages to 10.1 points and 4.5 rebounds per game.

Junior
Hart's 2015–16 Wildcats were the unanimous coaches preseason selection to win the conference. In the NIT season tip-off, Hart scored a career-high 27 points to help Villanova defeat Akron by a score of 75–56. On January 2, 2016, Hart scored 25 points in a win over Creighton. Hart led the Wildcats to reach number one in the AP Poll by climbing to the top of the 2015–16 NCAA Division I men's basketball rankings on February 8. He was named to the 35-man midseason watchlist for the Naismith Trophy on February 11.

At the conclusion of the regular season, Hart was unanimously selected first-team All-Big East. Hart was named a third-team All-American by the National Association of Basketball Coaches He then helped Villanova win its second national championship in school history, and first since 1985. On the season, he averaged 15.5 points, 6.8 rebounds, and 1.8 assists per game. Hart briefly thought about the 2016 NBA draft, but pulled his name out before the deadline.

Senior

Coming into his senior season, Hart's Wildcats were projected to win the Big East by the coaches and he was named Preseason Player of the Year. He was named to the Associated Press preseason All-America team on November 2, 2016.

In November Hart scored a then-career high 30 points vs Wake Forest in a 96–77 win at the Charleston Classic. On December 10, Hart scored a career-high 37 points along with 11 rebounds and four assists in a 74–66 win over Notre Dame to push No. 1 Villanova to a 10–0 record.

On March 11, 2017, in the regular season finale versus Creighton Bluejays Hart scored 29 points in a 74–60 win. Unlike the previous season, Hart's Villanova career would end in disappointment, when Bronson Koenig outgunned Hart and the other Wildcats while leading the Wisconsin Badgers to a 65–62 victory in the 2nd round in the Tournament.

On January 19, 2022, Hart's number 3 jersey was retired by the Wildcats.

Professional career

Los Angeles Lakers (2017–2019)
Hart was selected in the first round of the 2017 NBA draft by the Utah Jazz with the 30th overall pick. He was subsequently traded to the Los Angeles Lakers along with the 42nd overall pick, Thomas Bryant, in exchange for the Lakers' 28th overall pick, Tony Bradley. In his first start on December 14, 2017, Hart recorded a double-double against the Cleveland Cavaliers, scoring 11 points and grabbing 10 rebounds. Hart fractured his left hand in practice on February 28 and was sidelined until the end of March. In his final game as a rookie, Hart scored a career-high 30 points against the Los Angeles Clippers, shooting 7 of 9 from three. Hart finished the season averaging 7.9 points per game and 4.2 rebounds per game, recording 8 double-doubles. Hart shot 39.6% from three, leading the team in three-point percentage.

Hart was named the league MVP of the 2018 NBA Summer League after averaging 24.2 points and 5.2 rebounds per game and setting a new Summer League game-high of 37 points for the Lakers' players. Prior to the 2018–19 season, he switched his jersey to No. 3 after playing with No. 5 as a rookie. On March 28, 2019, the Lakers announced that Hart had undergone a successful ultrasonic debridement procedure on his right knee patellar tendon and was expected to miss the remainder of 2018–19 season.

New Orleans Pelicans (2019–2022)
On July 6, 2019, the Lakers traded Hart, Lonzo Ball, Brandon Ingram, the draft rights to De'Andre Hunter, two first round picks, a first-round pick swap and cash to the New Orleans Pelicans for All-Star Anthony Davis.

On February 16, 2021, Hart scored a season-high 27 points and grabbed nine rebounds during a 144-113 win against the Memphis Grizzlies.

On November 13, 2021, Hart recorded a career-high 11 assists in a 112–101 win over the Memphis Grizzlies.

Portland Trail Blazers (2022–2023)
On February 8, 2022, the Portland Trail Blazers acquired Hart, Nickeil Alexander-Walker, Tomáš Satoranský, Didi Louzada, a protected 2022 first-round draft pick, the better of New Orleans’ and Portland’s 2026 second-round draft picks and New Orleans’ 2027 second-round draft pick from the New Orleans Pelicans in exchange for CJ McCollum, Larry Nance Jr. and Tony Snell. On March 12, Hart scored a career-high 44 points, along with 8 rebounds and 6 assists, on 15-of-21 shooting and 6-of-9 from beyond the arc in a 127–118 victory over the Washington Wizards.

On November 7, 2022, Hart put up 12 points, nine rebounds, and eight assists, alongside a buzzer-beating, game-winning three in a 110–107 win over the Miami Heat.

New York Knicks (2023–present)
On February 9, 2023, Hart was traded to the New York Knicks in a four-team trade involving the Trail Blazers, Philadelphia 76ers and Charlotte Hornets. On February 11, Hart made his Knicks debut, recording 11 points, four assists, and seven rebounds in a 126–120 win over the Utah Jazz.

Career statistics

NBA

Regular season

|-
| style="text-align:left;"|
| style="text-align:left;"|L.A. Lakers
| 63 || 23 || 23.2 || .469 || .396 || .702 || 4.2 || 1.3 || .7 || .3 || 7.9
|-
| style="text-align:left;"|
| style="text-align:left;"|L.A. Lakers
| 67 || 22 || 25.6 || .407 || .336 || .688 || 3.7 || 1.4 || 1.0 || .6 || 7.8
|-
| style="text-align:left;"|
| style="text-align:left;"|New Orleans
| 65 || 16 || 27.0 || .423 || .342 || .739 || 6.5 || 1.7 || 1.0 || .4 || 10.1
|-
| style="text-align:left;"|
| style="text-align:left;"|New Orleans
| 47 || 4 || 28.7 || .439 || .326 || .775 || 8.0 || 2.3 || .8 || .3 || 9.2
|-
| style="text-align:left;"|
| style="text-align:left;"|New Orleans
| 41 || 40 || 33.5 || .505 || .323 || .753 || 7.8 || 4.1 || 1.1 || .3 || 13.4
|-
| style="text-align:left;"|
| style="text-align:left;"|Portland
| 13 || 13 || 32.1 || .503 || .373 || .772 || 5.4 || 4.3 || 1.2 || .2 || 19.9
|-
| style="text-align:left;"|
| style="text-align:left;"|Portland
| 51 || 51 || 33.4 || .504 || .304 || .731 || 8.2 || 3.9 || 1.1 || .2 || 9.5
|- class="sortbottom"
| style="text-align:center;" colspan="2"|Career
| 347 || 169 || 28.2 || .457 || .343 || .737 || 6.1 || 2.3 || .9 || .3 || 9.8

College

|-
| style="text-align:left;"|2013–14
| style="text-align:left;"|Villanova
| 34 || 1 || 21.4 || .500 || .313 || .677 || 4.4 || .9 || .6 || .3 || 7.8
|-
| style="text-align:left;"|2014–15
| style="text-align:left;"|Villanova 
| 36 || 2 || 25.5 || .515 || .464 || .670 || 4.5 || 1.5 || 1.1 || .4 || 10.1
|-
| style="text-align:left;"|2015–16
| style="text-align:left;"|Villanova
| 40 || 39 || 31.4 || .513 || .357 || .752 || 6.8 || 1.9 || 1.2 || .3 || 15.5
|-
| style="text-align:left;"|2016–17
| style="text-align:left;"|Villanova
| 36 || 35 || 33.1 || .510 || .404 || .747 || 6.4 || 2.9 || 1.6 || .3 || 18.7
|- class="sortbottom"
| style="text-align:center;" colspan="2"|Career
| 146 || 77 || 28.0 || .511 || .389 || .720 || 5.6 || 1.8 || 1.1 || .3 || 13.2

Awards and honors
College

 NCAA champion – (2016)
 Big East Player of the Year – (2017)
 Julius Erving Award – (2017)
 First-team All-American – SN (2017)
 Third-team All-American – (2016)
 First-team All-Big East – (2016, 2017)
 Big East tournament MOP – (2015)
 Big East Sixth Man of the Year – (2015)
 Robert V. Geasey Trophy (2017)

Personal life
Hart plays video games, such as Call of Duty: Modern Warfare on his Twitch channel.

Hart is a fan of his hometown club Washington Commanders, and is also a fan of English Premier League football club Chelsea F.C.

In October 2020, he donated $10,000 to the relief efforts for the Napa Valley wildfires.

Hart is married to Shannon Phillips.

References

External links

 Villanova Wildcats bio
 ESPN profile

1995 births
Living people
21st-century African-American sportspeople
African-American basketball players
All-American college men's basketball players
American men's basketball players
Basketball players from Maryland
Los Angeles Lakers players
New Orleans Pelicans players
New York Knicks players
People from Silver Spring, Maryland
Portland Trail Blazers players
Shooting guards
South Bay Lakers players
Sportspeople from Montgomery County, Maryland
Twitch (service) streamers
Utah Jazz draft picks
Villanova Wildcats men's basketball players